The Departmental Council of Cher is the deliberative assembly of the Cher department in the region of Centre-Val de Loire. It consists of 38 members (general councilors) from 19 cantons and its headquarters are in Bourges.

The President of the General Council is Jacques Fleury.

Vice-Presidents 
The President of the Departmental Council is assisted by 11 vice-presidents chosen from among the departmental advisers. Each of them has a delegation of authority.

References 

Cher
Cher (department)